The  San Francisco 49ers season was the franchise's 21st season in the National Football League, and the 25th overall. Quarterback John Brodie won the NFL MVP and the 49ers captured their first Divisional Title with a 10–3–1 record. Cornerback Bruce Taylor won Defensive Rookie of the Year honors. In the NFC Championship, the 49ers lost to the Dallas Cowboys in their final game at Kezar Stadium.

Offseason

NFL Draft

Roster

Preseason

Schedule

Regular season

Schedule

Standings

Playoffs

Schedule

Game officials

References

External links 
 1970 49ers on Pro Football Reference

San Francisco
NFC West championship seasons
San Francisco 49ers seasons
1970 in San Francisco
SAn